The Times of Northwest Indiana (NWI) is a daily newspaper headquartered in Munster, Indiana. It is the second-largest newspaper in Indiana, behind only The Indianapolis Star.

History
The paper was founded on June 18, 1906, as The Lake County Times. Its founder, Simon McHie, was a native of a small town along the Niagara River in Canada. In 1933, the name was changed to The Hammond Times, and it became an afternoon paper serving Hammond, Whiting, and East Chicago. In May 1962, the McHie family sold the publication to Robert S. Howard of Howard Publications. The paper expanded to all of northwest Indiana in 1967 and dropped Hammond from its masthead to become simply The Times. Offices were moved to Munster in 1989, and the paper began morning delivery and began printing different editions based on distribution region. The Howard papers were bought in April 2002 by Lee Enterprises.

Distribution
The Times prints different editions based on delivery region. The three major news regions are:
Munster (northern Lake County and adjacent suburbs in Illinois such as Calumet City)
Crown Point (southern Lake County)
Valparaiso (Porter and LaPorte counties)

The Times main office is located in Munster. There are bureau offices in Valparaiso and Indianapolis.

See also
List of newspapers in Indiana

References

External links
Official website
Lee Enterprises subsidiary profile of The Times

Newspapers published in Indiana
Lee Enterprises publications
Mass media in Gary, Indiana
Publications established in 1906
1906 establishments in Indiana